Land Without Stars (French: Le pays sans étoiles) is a 1946 French romantic drama film directed by Georges Lacombe and starring Jany Holt, Pierre Brasseur and Gérard Philipe.

The film's sets were designed by the art director Robert Gys.

Main cast
 Jany Holt as Catherine Le Quellec / Aurélia Talacayud  
 Pierre Brasseur as Jean-Thomas Pellerin / François-Charles Talacayud  
 Gérard Philipe as Simon Legouge / Frédéric Talacayud  
 Marthe Mellot as Anaïs Talacayud  
 Jane Marken as La secrétaire  
 Guy Favières as Joachim - le père d'Aurélia  
 Hélène Tossy as Bérengère  
 Edmond Castel as Le cousin  
 Paul Demange as Le premier clerc de notaire  
 Odette Barencey as Une amie d'Anaïs

References

Bibliography 
 Rège, Philippe. Encyclopedia of French Film Directors, Volume 1. Scarecrow Press, 2009.

External links 
 

1946 films
French romantic drama films
1946 romantic drama films
1940s French-language films
Films based on works by Pierre Véry
Films directed by Georges Lacombe
French black-and-white films
1940s French films
Films scored by Marcel Mirouze